The  is a Japanese boys' love (BL) manga series written and illustrated by Kanna Kii. The first book, was serialized in the bimonthly manga magazine On BLUE from 2013 to 2014. It was followed up with a sequel series, . L'étranger de la Plage has been published in English by the digital distribution platform Renta! under the title The Stranger by the Beach, and by Seven Seas Entertainment under the title Seaside Stranger. An anime film adaptation, The Stranger by the Shore, produced by Studio Hibari premiered on September 11, 2020.

Plot

L'étranger de la Plage
Shun Hashimoto is a gay novelist living in Okinawa who meets Mio Chibana, an orphaned high school student living with his relatives after his mother's death. However, Mio's reaction towards Shun reaching out to him reminds him of the estrangement from his parents after they discovered his sexual orientation. As Shun and Mio grow closer, Mio confesses that he is moving to the city, but promises to keep in contact once there.

Three years later, Mio suddenly moves back and confesses he is in love with Shun, but Shun is overcome with guilt from depriving him of a "normal" life. Meanwhile, Shun's childhood friend and ex-fiancée, Sakurako, arrives at the island to persuade him to return to Hokkaido due to his father's poor health. Shun is adamant on staying with Mio, but Mio urges him to return to reconcile with his family. Realizing Mio is genuinely in love with him and sensing the truth in his words, Shun decides to return to Hokkaido and asks Mio to accompany him.

L'étranger du Zéphyr
With Mio accompanying him, Shun visits his parents' house in Hokkaido and discovers Fumi, his younger brother adopted during his absence, and Sakurako had tricked him into reconciling with his father. Shun and Mio move in with the Hashimotos, with Shun's father and Fumi struggling to fully accept them as a couple. During Parents' Observation Day at Fumi's school, Shun unexpectedly runs into Wada, his classmate and first, albeit unrequited love. In the spring, Shun publishes his first novel and instantly gains media attention in spite of his anonymity due to being branded as a gay novelist. Five years later, Shun has taken a break from writing novels, while Fumi has become rebellious and resents him for rejecting Sakurako.

Characters

Shun is a 27-year-old gay novelist. Originally from Hokkaido, he moved to Okinawa to live with his grandmother after his parents discovered his sexual orientation. While he is attracted to Mio, he is reluctant to disclose his thoughts, as he often believes that Mio would never understand what being gay is like and would be better off not dating him.

Mio is a 20-year-old freeter. An Okinawa native who lives with relatives after his parents die. After his mother's death when he was in high school, he meets Shun. Initially offended at Shun's attitude, he soon falls in love and pursues him romantically when he returns to Okinawa as an adult. Mio attempts to get a better understanding of Shun's concerns, despite Shun constantly dismissing his advances.

Sakurako is Shun's childhood friend who has known he was gay since high school. Through an arranged marriage, she was also Shun's fiancée until he came out to his parents during the wedding ceremony. Despite this, Sakurako is still in love with him.

Eri is a woman who previously lived with Shun and his grandmother in Okinawa before moving out to live with her girlfriend, Suzu.

Suzu is Eri's girlfriend.

Fumi is Shun's younger brother, who was adopted from an orphanage and raised during Shun's absence. He is in love with Sakurako and finds it difficult to accept Shun and Mio's relationship.

Wada is Shun's classmate from high school who discovered Shun was gay after realizing Shun was in love with him. His wife, Yoneko, is a lawyer and a fan of Shun's work. They both have a daughter named Chiho from Yoneko's first marriage, who is in Fumi's class and does not get along with Wada.

Media

Manga
L'étranger de la Plage is written and illustrated by Kanna Kii, and it is her debut manga work. It was serialized in the bimonthly manga anthology On BLUE from 2013 to 2014. The chapters were later released in one bound volume by Shodensha under the Feel Comics On BLUE imprint. The manga is distributed in English by Renta! under the title The Stranger by the Beach. In December 2020, Seven Seas Entertainment announced that it had acquired the license to the series for release in July 2021 under the title Seaside Stranger: Umibe no Étranger.

The manga was followed up with a sequel series titled L'étranger du Zéphyr, which began publication in vol. 14 of On BLUE that was released on July 25, 2014. The chapters were later released in bound volumes by Shodensha under the On BLUE Comics imprint. In May 2021, Seven Seas Entertainment announced that it had acquired the license to the series under the title Seaside Stranger: Harukaze no Étranger

L'étranger de la Plage was adapted into a drama CD starring Taishi Murata as Shun and Yoshitsugu Matsuoka as Mio and was released on August 26, 2016. An exclusive talk CD was included at a bonus for a limited time at Animate. A drama CD adaptation of volume 1 of L'étranger du Zéphyr was released on October 27, 2017.

L'étranger de la Plage

L'étranger du Zéphyr

Anime film

On October 25, 2019, Fuji TV announced that they were producing an anime film adaptation of L'étranger de la Plage as part of its Blue Lynx boys' love anime label, set for a theatrical release on September 11, 2020. The film was animated by Studio Hibari and directed by Akiyo Ohashi. Kii, who had previously been an animator, supervised the film and was in charge of the character designs. Mina Kubota composed the music for the film, while the band Mono no Aware performed the film's theme song, "Zokkon" (From the Bottom of My Heart). Funimation licensed the film under the title, The Stranger by the Shore, streaming it on their website from July 9, 2021.

Reception
In 2014, L'étranger de la Plage was ranked #5 on the list of recommended boys' love stories in a survey of 470 employees across 400 bookstores nationwide in Japan. Referring to Kii's experience as an animator, Kozue Aou from Kono Manga ga Sugoi! praised her use of color contrasts, long shots and close-ups of the characters, and camera work that "speaks eloquently about the character's heart."

The second volume of L'étranger du Zéphyr debuted at #48 on Oricon, selling 17,457 copies in its first week. Kozue Aou from Kono Manga ga Sugoi! described the first volume of L'étranger du Zéphyr as "expressive" and a "first-class product" that "reflects the complex emotions of each character", describing Shun and Mio's journey to Hokkaido as having "warmth" that was realistic.

References

External links
  for L'étranger de la Plage
  for L'étranger du Zéphyr
 

2014 manga
Josei manga
Seven Seas Entertainment titles
Shodensha manga
Yaoi anime and manga